This is a list of gliders/sailplanes of the world, (this reference lists all gliders with references, where available) 
Note: Any aircraft can glide for a short time, but gliders are designed to glide for longer.

K

KAI
(Kazan Aviation Institute – Казанский авиационный институт)
 KAI-04 – G.H. Vorobyov
 KAI-6
 KAI-7
 KAI-8
 KAI-9
 KAI-11
 KAI-12 Primorets (LF107 Lunak)
 KAI-14
 KAI-17 - M.P. Simonov team leader
 KAI-18
 KAI-19
 KAI-50
 KAI-502

Kaiser
(Rudolf Kaiser)
 Kaiser Ka-1 Rhönlaus
 Schleicher Ka-2 Rhönschwalbe
 Schleicher Ka-3
 Schleicher Ka-4 Rhönlerche II
 Kaiser Ka-5
 Schleicher Ka-6 Rhönsegler
 Schleicher Ka-6E
 Schleicher Ka-7 Rhönadler
 Schleicher Ka-8
 Kaiser Ka-9
 Schleicher Ka-10
 Kaiser K-11

Kalinin OKB
 Kalinin K-11 – proof of concept glider for K-12 / BS-2 / K-13 tailless airliner / bomber

Kantor-Kurklik
(František Kantor & Karel Kurklik)
 Racek 3 Möwe
 Racek-3 Mrkev

Karpinski
 Karpiński 1929 glider
 Karpiński SL-1 Akar

Karski
(Julian Karski)
 Karski 1910 glider
 Karski 1912 glider

Karvelis 
(Balys Karvelis)
 Karvelis BK-1 Vanagas – Falcon
 Karvelis BK-2
 Karvelis BK-3
 Karvelis BK-4 Kaunas
 Karvelis BK-5
 Karvelis BK-6 Neringa
 Karvelis BK-7 Lietuva
 Karvelis BK-7A

Kasper 
(Witold Kasper)
 Kasper BKB
 Kasper Bekas 1-A
 Kasper Bekas N

Kasprzyk
 Kasprzyk Salamandra

Kassel 
(Segelflugzeugbau Kassel)
 Kassel 12 – Fieseler Flugzeugbau, Kassel
 Kassel 20 – Fieseler Flugzeugbau, Kassel
 Kassel 25 – Fieseler Flugzeugbau, Kassel
 Kassel 26 – Fieseler Flugzeugbau, Kassel
 Kassel 28 – Fieseler Flugzeugbau, Kassel
 Kassel Herkules – Fieseler Flugzeugbau, Kassel
 Kassel 1926 glider – Fritz Paul

Kayaba 
 Kayaba Ku-1
 Kayaba Ku-2 (萱场 2 型无尾翼滑翔机)
 Kayaba Ku-3
 Kayaba Ku-4
 Kayaba Model 1b

Kegel
(Kegel-Flugzeugbau Kassel / Max Kegel and Fritz Ackermann using logo AK / renamed Segelflugzeugbau Kassel using logo SK)
 Kegel I (Max kegel and Fritz Paul)
 Kegel I Blaue motorglider
 Kegel III
 Kegel Zögling - copies or licence-built?

Keihikoki
 Keihikoki SS-2 – (軽飛行機式　SS-2型上級単座滑空機)

Kelsey
(Frank Kelsey)
 Kelsey K-16
 Kelsey Klippety Klop

Kemeny
(Sándor Kemeny / MÁV Istvántelki Fõmûhely, Sportárutermelõ V. (former Aero Ever Ltd.), Esztergom)
 Kemény K-01
 Kemény K-02 Szellõ

Kendall 
(Hugh Kendall)
 Kendall K-1
 Kendall Crabpot

Kenilworth
 Kenilworth Me7

Kennedy-Watson
(Harold Kennedy and Floyd Watson)
 Kennedy K-W

Kensgailos
(Vlado Kensgailos)
 Kensgailos Žuvėdra

Kesselyàk
(Mihály Kesselyak / Workshop of the Airplane Service of the Hungarian Agricultural Ministry, Nyiregyháza)
 Kesselyàk KM-400

KhAI
(Kharkov Aviation Institute)
 KhAI-3 Харьков ХАИ-3

Keith-Weiss
(Alexander Keith & José Weiss)
 Keith-Weiss Aviette

Kimura
(Dr. Hidemasa Kimura)
 Kimura HK-1

Király-Berkovice
 Király-Berkovice I

Kirchner
(Wilhelm Kirchner at Kassel / Niederhessischer Verein für Luftfahrt)
 Kirchner La Pruvo
 Kirchner Futurum
 Kirchner Hessenland

Kirigamine
(Kirigamine Glider Manufacturing Co.)
 Kirigamine K14 
 Kirigamine Mita 3

Kissinger-Crookes
( Curtiss Kissinger, LeRoy Crookes)
 Kissinger-Crookes Flying Saucer

Kittelberger 
(Walter & Karl Kittelberger)
 Kittelberger WKM-1
 Kittelberger WKS-2
 Kittelberger WKS-3
 Kittelberger WKS-4

Klementyev
(P. Klementyev)
 Klementyev APS-11

Klobučar
(Viktor Klobučar)
 Klobučar 1911 glider

Klotz
 Klotz Moka-1 motor-glider (D-KLBY)

K.L.S.
('Start' Aviation Circle)
 K.L.S.2 – 
 K.L.S.3 – 'Start' Aviation Circle

Knechtel 
(Ing. Wilhelm Knechtel)
 Knechtel Rhönlerche IIM
 Knechtel KN-1
 Knechtel KN-2

Kocjan
(Antoni Kocjan)
 Kocjan Orlik
 Kocjan Orlik 2 (USAAC – XTG-7)
 Kocjan Orlik 3 Olympic Orlik
 Kocjan Bąk (horse-fly)
 Kocjan Bąk II
 Kocjan Bąk II bis
 Kocjan Czajka I (Lapwing)
 Kocjan Czajka II
 Kocjan Czajka III
 Kocjan Czajka bis
 Kocjan Komar (Gnat) 
 Kocjan Sokół
 Kocjan Wrona (Crow)
 Kocjan Wrona bis
 Kocjan Sroka (Magpie)
 Kocjan-Grzeszczyk Mewa
 Kocjan TG-7 (Orlik 2)

Kodytek
(Josef Kodytek)
 Kodytek 1925 glider

Köhl
(Hermann Köhl / Koehl)
 Köhl Ko-1 Nurflügler a.k.a. Koehl Ko-1

Kohler
(Spud Kohler)
 Kohler Alpha

Kokusai 
(Kokusai Koku Aircraft Company)
 Kokusai Ku-7 Manazuru a.k.a. Nihon Kogata Ku-7 Manazura
 Kokusai Ku-8 a.k.a. Nihon Kogata Ku-8

Kolbányi
 Kolbányi V

Kolesnikov 
(D.N. Kolesnikov)
 Kolesnikov DK-2 – Колесников ДК-2
 Kolesnikov DK-3
 Kolesnikov MKB-2
 Kolesnikov MKB-4
 Kolesnikov-Tsybin KTs-20

Komadori
 Komadori Primary

Königsberg Lüwa III
(Ostpreußischer Verein für Luftfahrt, Königsberg)
 Königsberg Lüwa III – Ostpreußischer Verein für Luftfahrt, Königsberg

Korolev
(Sergei P. Korolev)
 Korolev SC-3 Red Star – Королев СК-3 Красная звезда
 Korolev SK-9 – Королева СК-9
 Korolev RP-318-1

Konrad
(F. Konrad / Konrad Segelflugzeugbau)
 Konrad Ko Ro-4

Kopp
 Kopp Ko III

Kortenbach & Rauh 
(designed by Schultes, Seidel and Putz)
 Kortenbach & Rauh Kora 1

Gilbert Kosellek 
(Gilbert Kosellek)
 Kosellek G-1 Quo Vadis

Koser 
(KB – Koser-Branko)
 Koser-Hrovat KB-1 Triglav Jaroslav Koser & Stojan Hrovat – a.k.a.  K2A Triglav
 Koser KB-2 Udarnik – Cener-Slanovec
 Koser KB-3 Jadran – Jaroslav Koser – Branko Ivanus Institute, Celovška cesta, Ljubljana
 Koser KB-5 Triglav II – Jaroslav Koser
 Koser KB-5 Triglav III – Jaroslav Koser
 Koser KB-9 Udarnik – Cener-Slanovec

Kostenko-Rauschenbusch
(Костенко-Раушенбах ЛАК-1/2)
 Kostenko-Rauschenbusch LAK-1
 Kostenko-Rauschenbusch LAK-2

Kourouvakalis-Pikros
(Platon Kourouvakalis & Costas Pikros)
 Kourouvakalis-Pikros Anemopsaro

Koutný
(Ladislav Koutný)
 Koutný Konice 1
 Koutný Konice 4
 Koutný EL-KA-II

Kouzakov 
(M.A. Kouzakov)
 Kouzakov MAK-08 – Кузакова МАК -8
 Kouzakov MAK-12
 Kouzakov MAK-15
 Kouzakov MAK-15M
 Kouzakov MAK-15MP

Kovalenko
 Kovalenko DR-5

Koželuh
(Štkpt. Koželuh / Dílny 3, leteckého pluku v Nitrě)
 Koželuh Nitra 1
 Koželuh Nitra 3

Kráľovič
(Anton Kráľovič)
 Královič K-7 Úderník

Krekel
(Paul Krekel- Hans H. Hünebeck, Metall- und Rohrbau, Duisburg)
 Krekel Grille

Kristovskogo
(E. Kristovskogo)
 Spartakus 1

Kromer
(H. Kromer / Deutscher Fliegerbund, Mähr.-Schönberg)
 Kromer Mähr-Schönberg S. E. II

Kronfeld
(Robert Kronfeld)
 Kronfeld Vienna
 Kronfeld Austria

Krutchkoff
 Krutchkoff SHP-1 – HP-14 modification

Kryšpín
(Jan Kryšpín / Továrně Avia)
 Kryšpín JK-1 Perun

Krząkała
(Wiktor Krząkała)
 Krząkała 1928 glider

Ksoll
(J. Ksoll)
 Ksoll Breslau
 Ksoll Galgenvogel I
 Ksoll Galgenvogel III

Kubicki
(Jan Kubicki)
 Kubicki Ikub I

Kućfir
(Konrad Kućfir)
 Kućfir Pirat (Pirate) – First Polish Glider Contest August 1923

Kuffner
(Werner Kuffner / WK-Flugzeugtechnik, Peenemünde, DE)
 Kuffner WK-1

Kuhelj
(Anton Kuhelj)
 Kuhelj Inka I
 Kuhelj Inka Ia
 Kuhelj Inka II

Küpper
(August Küpper)
 Küpper Kü 2 Uhu
 Küpper Kü 4 Austria Elefant
 Küpper Kü 4 Mini Austria
 Küpper Kü 7
 Küpper Kr 1 Austria 2
 Küpper Kr 1a Austria 3

Kusbach-Bartoník-Kotolánem
(Kusbach Bartoník & Kotolánem)
 KKB-15

Kuzmickas 
(Antanas Kuzmickas)
 Kuzmickas KPI-3 Amber
 Kuzmickas KPI-3 Gintaras
 Kuzmickas KPI-4
 Kuzmickas KPI-5 Genys
 Kuzmickas M-1
 Kuzmickas M-2

Kyushu
(Hiroshi Sato, Osamu Hiroshi & Naka Maruta / Kyushu University)
 Kyushu 11

Notes

Further reading

External links

Lists of glider aircraft